Xinyuan Township, also spelled Sinyuan and Shinyuan, is a rural township in Pingtung County, Taiwan.

Geography
 Population: 33,038 (February 2023) 
 Area:

Administrative divisions
The township comprises 15 villages: Gangqi, Gangxi, Gonghe, Nanlong, Neizhuang, Tianyang, Wayao, Wufang, Wulong, Xianji, Xinglong, Xintung, Xinyuan, Yanpu and Zhongzhou.

Tourist attractions
 Jinde Bridge

Notable natives
 Chien Tai-lang, Secretary-General of the Executive Yuan (2015-2016)
 Huang Wen-hsing, singer and actor

References

External links 

Shinyuan Township Office 

Townships in Pingtung County